Michaela Wilhelmina Alida "Sheila" van den Bulk (born 6 April 1989) is a Dutch football midfielder who currently plays for Kristianstads DFF.

Career
She has played Eredivise football for ADO Den Haag.

On 4 June 2016, she made her debut for the Dutch national team, in a friendly match against South Africa.

She was part of the Dutch team which won the UEFA Women's Euro 2017.

Honours

International
Netherlands
Winner
 UEFA European Women's Championship: 2017
 Algarve Cup: 2018

References

External links
 Sheila van den Bulk  at Onsoranje.nl
 
 

Dutch women's footballers
Netherlands women's international footballers
Djurgårdens IF Fotboll (women) players
Damallsvenskan players
1989 births
Living people
Expatriate women's footballers in Sweden
Expatriate women's footballers in Norway
SK Brann Kvinner players
ADO Den Haag (women) players
Eredivisie (women) players
Dutch expatriate sportspeople in Sweden
Dutch expatriate sportspeople in Norway
Kolbotn Fotball players
Toppserien players
Footballers from Rotterdam
UEFA Women's Championship-winning players
Women's association football midfielders
Dutch expatriate women's footballers
UEFA Women's Euro 2017 players